The Law Society of Hong Kong is the professional association and law society for solicitors in Hong Kong, established in 1907. The Hong Kong Bar Association is the equivalent association for barristers in Hong Kong.

The Law Society is currently headed by President C. M. Chan (陳澤銘) and is located on the third floor of Wing On House in Central.

History 
It was formed on 8 April 1907 as a company limited by guarantee, and was then known as The Incorporated Law Society of Hong Kong. The present name was adopted in 1969.

In 2014, the society underwent its first ever motion of no confidence in its president over his declared support for the white paper published by the PRC on the city's autonomy in which patriotism was a prerequisite for the territory's judges. Ambrose Lam's declaration appeared to be at odds with sentiment of its members, a thousand of whom marched in response to the white paper. Over 100 petitioners objected to Lam's politicisation of the Law Society, requesting that Lam withdraw his comments and reassert support for judicial independence. The tabler of the no confidence vote had expected Lam to be able to call on a large reservoir of proxy votes in his defence. At a meeting called for 14 August 2014, Lam suffered a surprising defeat in the non-binding vote calling for him to resign. The motion was carried by 2,392 votes to 1,478, with almost half its members voting in person or by proxy. There had been complaints of members receiving external pressure from Chinese companies, the central government Liaison Office, and members of the CPPCC National Committee. Lam resigned on 19 August 2014, with neither an apology nor a retraction.

President 
On 5 January 2022, Carrie Lam announced new warnings and restrictions against social gathering due to potential COVID-19 outbreaks. One day later, it was discovered that president Chan Chak-ming attended a birthday party hosted by Witman Hung Wai-man, with 222 guests. At least one guest tested positive with COVID-19, causing many guests to be quarantined.

In November 2022, president Chan Chak-ming said that he and 3 vice-presidents recently went overseas to dispel ideas that "there is no judicial independence, fair trials and free speech" in Hong Kong.

In January 2023, after the NPCSC gave the Chief Executive power to ban foreign lawyers in response to Jimmy Lai attempting to hire Tim Owen, Chan said the NPCSC's decision was a "good example" of the government's commitment to implementing One Country, Two Systems.

Structure 
The society is divided into two bodies:
 The Council – the governing body of the society and consists of 20 members with 2 vice-presidents and 1 president.
 The Secretariat – the body responsible for the standing committees within the society and has around 100 staff.

Profile of the profession 
As of 30 September 2018, the Law Society regulates 9,708 solicitors in Hong Kong with a current practising certificate.

Structure of the profession 
 7,167 solicitors were in private practice in 908 firms.
 Of these firms:
 47% were sole practitioners. Of all the sole practitioners, 44% did not employ any other legally qualified persons.
 196 firms employed a total of 934 trainee solicitors.
 2,805 were in partnerships or were sole practitioners.
 4,362 solicitors are assistant solicitors or consultants in firms.
 2,032 solicitors worked with private businesses (in-house) or in government (Department of Justice, etc.).

Foreign lawyers 
Foreign lawyers in Hong Kong come from 33 jurisdictions (at 30 September 2018)
 433 foreign lawyers employed by 85 foreign firms.
 1,100 foreign lawyers employed in local law firms.

Gender 
 Of all practising solicitors, 54% were men and 46% were women.
 However, of the 934 trainee solicitors, 40% were men and 60% were women.

Ethnicity 
 83% of practising solicitors were ethnic Chinese.

Finance 
In 2006, the Society's income was HK$86.0 million, HK$46.26 million being raised through annual practising certificate fees and membership subscriptions.

In 2007, the Society's income was HK$91.6 million, HK$47.7 million being raised through annual practising certificate fees and membership subscriptions.

The fee for a practising certificate was HK$6,800 and the fee for membership subscription was HK$1,200.

The Society had an annual income budget of HK$80.6 million for 2007.

In 2017, the Society generated an income of HK$103 million, out of which HK$47 million was raised through annual practising certificate fees. The annual practising certificate fee in 2017 was HK$5,000 and membership fee was HK$800.

Artistic Work 

On the 22nd of July 2022, the Society uploaded a music video of 《Love for Hong Kong – 法治新一代》, "a song dedicated to the learning and protection of the rule of law amongst the general public, in particular young people", to its official YouTube channel. The song was composed and lyricized by the preceding president Pang. The video description states that it featured the singing and dancing performance of Eastern District Youth and Children’s Choir, a group of children, incumbent president C. M. Chan, and other council members.

List of presidents 

 1950–51: C. Y. Kwan
 1957–58: K. Y. Kan
 1959–60: P. C. Woo
 1962–6?: Peter A. L. Vine
 1969–71: T. S. Lo 
 1971–7?: Brian Mcelney
 1973–75: Peter C. Wong
 1975–76: I. R. A. MacCallum
 1976–77: K. L. Mak
 1977–79: C. H. Wong
 1979–81: Edmund Cheung 
 1981–83: P. S. Wan
 1983–84: T. S. Tong
 1984–85: Tim Freshwater
 1985–87: Brian Tisdall
 1987–89: Simon Ip
 1989–92: Alfred Donald Yap
 1992–93: Ambrose Lau
 1993–96: Roderick Woo
 1996–97: Christopher Chan 
 1997–2000: Anthony Chow
 2000–02: Herbert Tsoi 
 2002–04: S. H. Ip
 2004–05: Michael Lintern-Smith 
 2005–07: Peter C. L. Lo
 2007–09: Lester Huang
 2009–11: Huen Wong
 2011–12: Junius Ho
 2012–13: Dieter Yih
 2013–14: Ambrose Lam
 2014–16: Stephen Hung
 2016–18: Thomas So
 2018–21: Melissa K. Pang
 2021-Incumbent: C. M. Chan

See also
 Hong Kong Bar Association
 The Law Society
 The Incorporated Law Society of Northern Ireland
 The Law Society of Scotland
 Law Society of Singapore
 The Law Society of Upper Canada
 Postgraduate Certificate in Laws

References

External links 
 
 《Love for Hong Kong – 法治新一代》

Law of Hong Kong
1907 establishments in Hong Kong
Bar associations of Asia
Professional associations based in Hong Kong
Law societies
Solicitors of Hong Kong
Organizations established in 1907